The Alto Milanese ("Upper Milanese" or "Northern Milanese") is a highly populated and industrialized area of Lombardy, comprising the northwestern part of the province of Milan, the southern part of the province of Varese and a few municipalities of the southeastern part of the province of Como. It has an area of 235 square kilometres and a population of some 700,000 people, making it one of the most densely populated areas of Italy. Its main cities are Busto Arsizio, Legnano, Gallarate and Saronno; its main rivers are the Olona and the Ticino.

It comprises seventy municipalities, of which forty-three belong to the province of Varese, twenty-four to the province of Milan, and three to the province of Como. It is crossed by the A8 and A9 autostrade and by the Milan–Malpensa, Domodossola–Milan  and Saronno–Novara railways, and it is home to the Malpensa International Airport.

References

Lombardy
Geography of Lombardy
Geographical, historical and cultural regions of Italy